Leonhard Hutter (also Hütter, Latinized as Hutterus; 19 January 1563 – 23 October 1616) was a German Lutheran theologian.

Life
He was born at Nellingen near Ulm.  From 1581 he studied at the universities of Strasbourg, Leipzig, Heidelberg and Jena. In 1594 he began to give theological lectures at Jena, and in 1596 accepted a call as professor of theology at Wittenberg, where he died twenty years later.

Works
Hutter was a stern champion of Lutheran orthodoxy, as set down in the confessions and embodied in his own Compendium locorum theologicorum (1610; reprinted 1863), being so faithful to his master as to win the title of "Luther redonatus."

In reply to Rudolf Hospinian's Concordia discors (1607), he wrote a work, rich in historical material but one-sided in its argument, Concordia concors (1614), defending the formula of Concord, which he regarded as inspired. His Irenicum vere christianum is directed against David Pareus (1548–1622), professor primarius at Heidelberg, who in Irenicum sive de unione et synodo Evangelicorum (1614) had pleaded for a reconciliation of Lutheranism and Calvinism; his Calvinista aulico-politicus (1610) was written against the "damnable Calvinism" which was becoming prevalent in Holstein and Brandenburg. Another work, based on the Formula of Concord, was entitled Loci communes theologici.

Notes

References

1563 births
1616 deaths
People from Alb-Donau-Kreis
17th-century Latin-language writers
German Lutheran theologians
17th-century German Protestant theologians
Academic staff of the University of Wittenberg
German male non-fiction writers
17th-century German writers
17th-century German male writers
16th-century Lutheran theologians
17th-century Lutheran theologians